Jos is a given name and nickname (often of Joseph, Jozef, Josephus, etc.) which may refer to:

 Jos van Aert (born 1962), Dutch cyclist
 Jos Bax (1946–2020), Dutch footballer
 Jos Baxendell (born 1972), English rugby union player
 Jos Beijnen (born 1956), Dutch pharmacist
 Jos Brink (1942–2007), Dutch actor
 Joseph Jos Broeckx (born 1951), Belgian sprint canoer
 Jocelyn Jos Burley (born 1943), New Zealand female cricketer
 Joseph Jos Buttler (born 1990), English cricketer
 Jozef Jos Chabert (1933–2014), Belgian politician
 Jos Charles (born 1988), American poet
 Jos Chathukulam, Indian academic
 Jozef Jos Daerden (born 1954), Belgian footballer
 Jos De Haes (1920–1974), Belgian writer
 Jos De Mey (1928–2007), Flemish-Belgian painter
 Jos de Putter (born 1959), Dutch film director
 Joseph Jos Deschoenmaecker (born 1947), Belgian cyclist
 Jos Devlies, Belgian physician
 Jos van Eck (born 1963), Dutch former footballer, manager and coach
 Jos van Emden (born 1985), Dutch cyclist
 Jos Engelen (born 1950), Dutch physicist
 Jos Frissen (1892–1982), Dutch painter
 Josephus Jos Geysels (born 1952), Belgian politician
 Jos Gielen (1898-1981), Dutch politician and literary historian
 Jos Haex (born 1959), Belgian cyclist
 Josephus Jos Hermens (born 1950), Dutch long-distance runner
 Jos van Herpen (born 1962), Dutch footballer
 Jozef Jos Heyligen (born 1947), Belgian footballer
 Jos Hinsen (1931-2009), Dutch cyclist
 Jos Hoevenaers (1932–1995), Belgian cyclist
 Jos Hooiveld (born 1983), Dutch footballer
 Jos Huysmans (1941-2012), Belgian cyclist
 Jos Jacobs (born 1953), Belgian cyclist
 Jos Jullien (1877-1956), French painter.
 Josephus Jos van Kemenade (1937-2020), Dutch politician
 Jos Lammertink (born 1958), Dutch cyclist
 Josephus Jos van der Lans (born 1954), Dutch psychologist
 Jozef Jos Lansink (born 1961), Dutch equestrian
 Jos LeDuc (real name Michel Pigeon, 1944–1999), Canadian professional wrestler
 Jozef Lieckens (born 1959), Belgian cyclist
 Jos Luhukay (born 1963), Dutch football coach
 Johannes Jos Lussenburg (1889–1975), Dutch painter
 Jos van Nieuwstadt (born 1979), Dutch footballer
 Jos Pronk (born 1983), Dutch cyclist
 Jozef Jos Punt (born 1946), Dutch Roman Catholic bishop
 Joshua Jos Randles (1865–1925), English footballer
 Jozef Jos van Rey (born 1945), Dutch politician
 Jos Romersa (born 1915), Luxembourgian gymnast
Jos Sances (born 1952), American artist
 Jos Seckel (1881–1945), Dutch artist
 Jos Schipper (born 1951), Dutch cyclist
 Jos Schurgers (born 1947), Dutch motorcycle racer
 Jos Stam (born 1965), Dutch computer scientist
 Jos Stelling (born 1945), Dutch film director
 Jos Vaessen (born 1944), Belgian football team president and businessperson
 Jos Van Immerseel (born 1945), Belgian harpsichordist
 Jos van der Vegt (born 1953), Dutch businessperson
 Jos van Veldhoven (born 1952), Dutch choral conductor
 Josephus Jos Vandeloo (1925-2015), Belgian writer and poet
 Jos Verhulst (born 1949), Belgian chemist
 Johannes Jos Verstappen (born 1972), Dutch racing driver
 Jos van der Vleuten (1943-2011), Dutch cyclist

See also
Jos Louis, a snack cake

Dutch masculine given names
Lists of people by nickname